The 2019 Exeter City Council election took place on 2 May 2019 to elect the members of Exeter City Council in Devon, England. This was on the same day as other local elections. 14 of the 39 seats were up for re-election: those of the candidates who had finished second in the all-out election of 2016, with a double vacancy in Priory ward. The Labour Party remained in control with 29 seats, with the Conservatives as the main opposition party, with 6 seats.

Council composition

Before this election, the composition of the council was:

After this election, the composition of the council was:

Election summary

|- style="text-align: right; font-weight: bold;"
! scope="row" colspan="2" | Total
| 64
| 14
| 4
| 4
| 
| 100
| 100
| 32,883
| 434

Results by ward
(*) Asterisk denotes the sitting councillor.

Alphington

Note: The outgoing councillor Chris Musgrave was elected as Labour in 2016, but defected to the Green Party in February 2017.

Duryard & St.James

Exwick

Heavitree

Mincinglake & Whipton

Newtown & St.Leonards

Pennsylvania

Pinhoe

Priory (2 seats)

St Davids

St Loyes

St Thomas

Topsham

References

External links 
Exeter City Council

2019 English local elections
2019
2010s in Exeter
May 2019 events in the United Kingdom